Carex spicigera is a tussock-forming species of perennial sedge in the family Cyperaceae. It is native to Sri Lanka.

It was described by the botanist Christian Gottfried Daniel Nees von Esenbeck in 1834 as published in Contributions to the Botany of India.

See also
List of Carex species

References

spicigera
Plants described in 1834
Taxa named by Christian Gottfried Daniel Nees von Esenbeck
Flora of Sri Lanka